Simen Fougner (1701–1783) was a Norwegian farmer, poet and non-fiction writer.

Simen Amundsen Fougner was born at Fougner in Follebu parish of Gausdal  district (Fougner søndre, Follebu, Østre Gausdal)  in Oppland, Norway.  He was the son of farmer Amund Olsen Fougner (1652-1723). He was married to Thore Ellefsdatter Fykse (ca. 1704–1792). Fougner was an industrious and creative farmer who made good use of his land.

He is best remembered as one of the earliest Norwegian authors from a rural background. A selection of his poetry was published posthumously in 1920, and his topographical description of Gausdal was published in 1921.

References

1701 births
1783 deaths
People from Gausdal
Norwegian farmers
18th-century Norwegian poets
Norwegian male poets
Norwegian non-fiction writers
18th-century male writers
Male non-fiction writers